The Black Bull  (Spanish: El toro negro) is a 1959 Mexican film. It was written by Luis Alcoriza.

External links
 

1959 films
Mexican drama films
1950s Spanish-language films
1950s Mexican films